The 2013 Campeonato de la Victoria or 2013 Torneo de la Victoria was held at the Secretaria Nacional de Deportes in Asunción, organized by Federación Paraguaya de Atletismo. It was the 63rd edition.

The competition serves as the Paraguayan Athletics Championships in track and field for the Republic of Paraguay, being the country's most important national athletics competitions.

Results
Results of the competition were published on the official website of the Federación Paraguaya de Atletismo.

Women's

Javelin throw

Hammer throw

See also
 Sport in Paraguay
 Paraguayan Olympic Committee
 Paraguayan Athletics Federation
 Paraguayan records in athletics
 List of athletics clubs in Paraguay

References

2013
Paraguayan Championships
Athletics Championships
Sports competitions in Asunción
2013 Paraguayan Athletics Championships
October 2013 sports events in South America